Lister, British Columbia is a small community in the Kootenays region of British Columbia, Canada. It is located 10 miles (16 km) southeast of Creston and is just north of the Canada–US border.

Originally known as Camp Lister, it was established by Colonel Fred Lister after the First World War as a soldiers' settlement. He later became the MLA for the Nelson-Creston riding. The community's name was officially changed to Lister on November 29, 1984. Lister is the closest community to the Bountiful commune.

Climate

Notes

References

Populated places in the Regional District of Central Kootenay
Unincorporated settlements in British Columbia
East Kootenay